The 1964 Nobel Peace Prize was awarded to the American Baptist minister and activist Martin Luther King Jr. (1929–1968) "for his non-violent struggle for civil rights for the Afro-American population." He is the twelfth American recipient to the prestigious Peace Prize.

Laureate

An adherent of Gandhi's principle of nonviolence, Rev. King began his efforts to persuade the U.S. Government to declare uncivil all the policies of racial discrimination in the southern states. His nonviolent struggle for civil rights and equality encountered violence and threats from racists and white supremacists. In 1963, more than 250,000 demonstrators marched to the Lincoln Memorial in Washington, where he gave his influential speech "I Have a Dream" in which he called for civil and economic rights and an end to racism in the United States. The following year, President Lyndon B. Johnson signed the law prohibiting all racial discrimination. Finding resistance from white officials, Rev. King lead another peaceful march in 1965 to totally end racial segregation and recognize African-Americans constitutional right to vote. In April 1968, he was assassinated for his civil rights advocacy, which was later continued by his wife, Coretta Scott King, and other surviving pioneers of the movement.

Deliberations

Nominations
Reverend King had not been nominated before for the peace prize, making him one of the laureates who won on a rare occasion when they have been awarded the Nobel Prize in Literature the same year they were first nominated. He received only two nominations: from Colin W. Bell (1903–1988) of the American Friends Service Committee and a joint nomination by 8 members of the Swedish Parliament.

In total, the Norwegian Nobel Committee received 92 nominations for 36 individuals and 8 organizations including Vinoba Bhave, Charles Braibant, Cyrus S. Eaton, Adolfo López Mateos, Trygve Lie, Clarence Streit, the UNICEF (awarded in 1965) and the Universal Esperanto Association. Thirteen individuals and two organizations were nominated for the first time such as Lyndon B. Johnson, Josef Hromádka, Norman Thomas, Mohammad Reza Pahlavi, Abraham Vereide, Paul-Henri Spaak and Oxford Committee for Famine Relief. Austrian philanthropist Hermann Gmeiner had the highest number of nominations with 25 different recommendations. No women were nominated that year. Notable figures like Molly Childers, Anna J. Cooper, Elizabeth Gurley Flynn, Douglas MacArthur, Jeanne Mélin, Karl Polanyi and Georg Friedrich Nicolai died in 1964 without having been nominated for the peace prize while the American philanthropist Stephen Galatti died months before the announcement.

Reactions

Martin Luther King received the news of his Nobel recognition while he was undergoing a medical checkup at St. Joseph's Hospital in Tampa, Florida. Interviewed by news correspondents of The New York Times, he said: 

Dr. King shared that he would use the prize money to advance the civil rights movement. The United States‐Ambassador Margaret Joy Tibbetts reacted, saying: "As an American and representative of the American people, I want to express joy and gratitude that one of my fellow countrymen has been awarded this prize." His wife, Coretta, confessed: "For many years we have had to contend with the other side. For something like this to happen makes it all worthwhile."

Norwegian Nobel Committee
The following members of the Norwegian Nobel Committee appointed by the Storting were responsible for the selection of the 1964 Nobel laureate in accordance with the will of Alfred Nobel:

References

External links

1964
Martin Luther King Jr.